General elections were held in Senegal on 27 February 1983 to elect a President and National Assembly. Incumbent Abdou Diouf, who had taken office in January 1981 following the resignation of Léopold Sédar Senghor, defeated four other candidates in the presidential election. Members of the National Assembly were elected using a mixed-member majoritarian system, with sixty members being chosen by the single-member plurality system and sixty being chosen by closed-list proportional representation. In the National Assembly election Diouf's Socialist Party won 111 of the 120 seats. Voter turnout was 56.2% in the Assembly election and 56.7% in the presidential election.

Results

President

National Assembly

References

Further reading

Senegal
Elections in Senegal
1983 in Senegal
Presidential elections in Senegal